Deserter USA is a 1969 Swedish film about Americans living in Sweden to avoid the draft.

It stars American John Ashley - not the actor by that name but an American who deserted and sought asylum in Sweden.

The director Lars Lambert later went to jail for refusing the draft in Sweden.

References

External links
Deserter USA at TCMDB

Deserter USA in The New York Times

1969 films
English-language Swedish films
1960s English-language films
1960s Swedish films